Piso Firme Airport  is a public use airport within the Paragua River village of Piso Firme in the Santa Cruz Department of Bolivia. The runway parallels the river.

See also

Transport in Bolivia
List of airports in Bolivia

References

External links 
OpenStreetMap - Piso Firme
OurAirports - Piso Firme
HERE Maps - Piso Firme

Airports in Santa Cruz Department (Bolivia)